Octophialucium is a genus of Hydrozoan in the family Malagazziidae. The genus contains bioluminescent species.

Species
The following species are recognized:

Octophialucium aphrodite (Bigelow, 1928)
Octophialucium bigelowi Kramp, 1955
Octophialucium funerarium (Quoy & Gaimard, 1827)
Octophialucium haeckeli (Vannucci & Soares Moreira, 1966)
Octophialucium huangweiae Xu, Huang & Guo, 2007
Octophialucium indicum Kramp, 1958
Octophialucium krampi Bouillon, 1984
Octophialucium medium Kramp, 1955
Octophialucium mollis Bouillon, 1984
Octophialucium neustona Xu, Huang & Guo, 2007
Octophialucium sinensis Huang, Xu, Guo & Qiu, 2010
Octophialucium solidum (Menon, 1932)

References

Malagazziidae
Hydrozoan genera
Bioluminescent cnidarians